Honey Bones is the third studio album by Angus Stone; first under the name Dope Lemon and was released in June 2016. The album peaked at number 11 in Australia.

Reception
Charmaine de Souza from The Music said "Honey Bones is an effortlessly cool collection of breezy tunes that's guaranteed to be every triple j fan's wet dream. The stellar combination of dreamy vocals and layered hooks is rough around the edges in all the right ways and works hard at putting its listener in an almost inescapable trance."

Amanda Sherring from Forte Magazine said "This album fine tunes everything [Stone has] done in the past to reach the epitome of what it means to blend fantasy and reality" saying her personal favourite is "Stonecutters" adding "There's psych, tribal, folk and rock all wrapped up into one bundle of daydream-igniting bliss."

Track listing

Charts

References

2016 albums
Angus Stone albums